The Kabul Zoo, is located in Kabul, Afghanistan, on the bank of the Kabul River and adjacent to the Deh Mazang Circle. The zoo's director is Aziz Gul Saqeb.

History
It was inaugurated in 1967 with a focus on Afghan fauna, being very popular with visitors and press. The zoo once had more than 500 animals, with about 150,000 visitors coming to see them in 1972.

The zoo suffered significant damage during the 1990s civil war; the aquarium was damaged by shelling, and combatants took the deer and rabbits for food. An elephant, 25-year-old Hathi, was killed when a rocket hit the zoo. Some exotic animals like rare species of birds, were smuggled out and sold in the black market. The Taliban, who took Kabul in 1996, initially thought the zoo was incompatible with their version of Islam, but kept it open after the zookeeper Sheraq Omar confirmed through research at the Kabul University that Prophet Muhammad himself kept pets.

The most famous resident of the zoo was Marjan the Lion, who died in 2002 and is buried there. A bronze statue of Marjan stands at the zoo's entrance.

, the zoo had about 280 animals, including 45 species of birds and mammals, and 36 species of fish. Among the animals there are two lions and Afghanistan's only pig. As many as 10,000 people visit during the weekends. The zoo employed a staff of 60 to care for the animals . It is a popular place for Kabulites.

The zoo took in 15 million Afs ($268,000) in revenue in 2012.

In April 2017, the zoo took four of the white lions that were saved from a smuggling attempt.

Donations and assistance
 The Chinese government, a primary donor of animals, has expressed concerns about the safety of the animals it has already donated to Afghanistan. In 2004 – 2005, one male bear and one deer died, apparently from diseases and improper nutrition. Chinese authorities say they will not donate any more animals to Kabul until conditions improve.
 The North Carolina Zoo in the United States of America has funded and supervised many projects at the zoo, including improvements to housing of the animals, such as climbing structures and standoff barriers, with additional help in creating a business plan for the zoo. Director David Jones tried to help send Kabul Zoo staff to India, for training.
 ZSL London Zoo in the United Kingdom shared its expertise with Kabul Zoo Director Aziz Gul during a visit to London in January 2019.

See also
 Wildlife of Afghanistan

References

Kabul
Zoos in Afghanistan
Zoos established in 1967
1967 establishments in Afghanistan